The Mail Tribune was a seven-day daily newspaper based in Medford, Oregon, United States that served Jackson County, Oregon, and adjacent areas of Josephine County, Oregon and northern California.

The paper ceased operations on January 13, 2023. The closure was announced by Rosebud Media the paper's owner, two days prior.

Its coverage area centered on Medford and Ashland and included many small communities in Jackson County. The newspaper also covered Central Point, Talent, Eagle Point, Grants Pass and Phoenix, as well as Jacksonville and other cities in the Rogue Valley.

History
George Putnam bought the Medford Tribune and two smaller weekly newspapers on April 2, 1907. In 1910, he purchased the Medford Mail and combined it with the Tribune to create the Mail Tribune. He later sold the paper in order to purchase the Salem Capital Journal.

The Mail Tribune was awarded the 1934 Pulitzer Prize for Meritorious Service, for its coverage of corrupt Jackson County politicians.

Ottaway Newspapers, the predecessor of Local Media Group purchased the Medford paper in 1973, and also owned the nearby Ashland Daily Tidings. The company was purchased by Dow Jones, owner of The Wall Street Journal. Dow Jones was acquired by  News Corp.owned by Rupert Murdoch 

On September 4, 2013, News Corp announced that it would sell the Dow Jones Local Media Group to Newcastle Investment Corp., an affiliate of Fortress Investment Group for $87 million. The newspapers were be operated by GateHouse Media, owned by Fortress.

News Corp. CEO and former Wall Street Journal editor Robert James Thomson indicated that the newspapers were "not strategically consistent with the emerging portfolio" of the company. GateHouse in turn filed prepackaged Chapter 11 bankruptcy on September 27, 2013, to restructure its debt obligations in order to accommodate the acquisition. 

The Mail Tribune and Ashland Daily Tidings were sold to Rosebud Media in 2017 for a reported $15 million.

On September 21, 2022, the Mail Tribune announced it would discontinue its printed edition and only publish online. The Mail Tribune published its final online articles on January 13, 2023, and ceased operations.

Special sections
The Mail Tribune had four special feature sections that ran regularly each week. Sunday's edition contained a Your Life section, with general lifestyle content. Wednesday contained the A La Carte section, which featured food articles. Friday was the Oregon Outdoors section, containing local and regional outdoors stories. Friday's edition also contained Tempo, a tabloid insert about local arts and entertainment.

Newsroom
The Mail Tribune North Fir Street newsroom included reporters, assigning editors, and multimedia staff, copy editing and page design, as well as a separate sports department.

References

External links
MailTribune.com
  (editor from 1968–1986)
 
 

1907 establishments in Oregon
Medford, Oregon
Mass media in Jackson County, Oregon
Newspapers published in Jackson County, Oregon
Newspapers published in Oregon
Oregon Newspaper Publishers Association
Newspapers established in 1907
Pulitzer Prize for Public Service winners
2023 disestablishments in Oregon
Defunct newspapers published in Oregon